Centauri may refer to:

 Any of the stars (or star systems), in the constellation Centaurus, including:
 Alpha Centauri, a binary star including the brightest star of Centaurus
 Beta Centauri, the second-brightest star of Centaurus, at a much greater distance from the Sun
 Proxima Centauri, the nearest to the Sun of all stars, and close to Alpha Centauri
 Sid Meier's Alpha Centauri, a 1999 computer game
 Centauri Production, a Czech computer games company
 Centauri (Babylon 5), a species, civilization, and related terms, in the US TV series Babylon 5
 Centauri, a character in the US movie The Last Starfighter

See also
Centaur (disambiguation)
Centaure (disambiguation)
Centaurus (disambiguation)